Du Barry Was a Lady is a Broadway musical, with music and lyrics by Cole Porter, and the book by Herbert Fields and Buddy DeSylva. The musical starred Bert Lahr, Ethel Merman and Betty Grable, and the song "Friendship" was one of the highlights. The musical was made into a 1943 Technicolor film Du Barry Was a Lady,  starring Red Skelton,  Lucille Ball, Gene Kelly and Tommy Dorsey and his orchestra.

Plot
A washroom attendant, Louis Blore, has won a sweepstakes, and subsequently quits his job. He is in love with the nightclub singer May Daly, but she is in love with Alex Barton.  Alex is the brother of her friend Alice, who is in love with Harry Norton. Meanwhile, Alex is unhappily married to Ann. Charley, Louis's replacement, suggests that Louis slip Alex a Mickey Finn. While trying to do so, Louis inadvertently drinks the Mickey Finn, falls asleep, and dreams he is King Louis XV of France, and that May is Madame du Barry.

In his dream, Charley becomes the Dauphin (later Louis XVI) and Harry becomes the captain of the guard, with Ann as Du Barry's lady-in-waiting, and Alex as a peasant who wrote a rude song about The King and Du Barry (the title song: Du Barry Was a Lady). Eventually after various entanglements (including the Dauphin's shooting the King in the posterior with a bow and arrow), Louis wakes up and realises that Alex is the man for May. He uses the last of his winnings to pay for Alex's divorce from Ann, and (with Charley having just quit his job) goes back to being a washroom attendant.

Productions

1939 Broadway

The musical opened on Broadway at the 46th Street Theatre on December 6, 1939, transferred to the Royale Theatre on October 21, 1940 and closed December 12, 1940, after 408 performances. It was directed by Edgar MacGregor, choreographed by Robert Alton, with the orchestrations of Robert Russell Bennett and Ted Royal. The cast featured  Bert Lahr as Louis Blore, Ethel Merman as May Daly, Betty Grable as Alice Barton, Benny Baker as Charley, Ronald Graham as Alex Barton and Charles Walters as Harry Norton. Gypsy Rose Lee and Frances Williams later played the part of May Daly.

West End 
The show opened in the West End at Her Majesty's Theatre on 22 October 1942 and ran for 178 performances. It was directed by Richard Bird. The cast featured Arthur Riscoe as Louis Blore,  Frances Day as May Daly, Frances Marsden as Alice Barton, Jacky Hunter as Charley, Bruce Trent as Alex Barton and Teddy Beaumont as Harry Norton.

Later productions
The show has been produced in concert form several times in both the United States and the United Kingdom. The two London productions, in 1993 and 2001, were by the Discovering Lost Musicals Charitable Trust and featured Louise Gold as May Daly with Barry Cryer as Louis in 1993 and Desmond Barrit in 2001. The May 1993 production was at the Barbican Centre. The November 2001 concert was (like the original London production) at Her Majesty's Theatre, recorded for radio by the BBC (it was broadcast on BBC Radio 3 during Christmas 2002).

New York City Center Encores! presented a staged concert in February 1996 with Robert Morse (Louis) and Faith Prince (May). New York's Musicals Tonight! presented a production March–April, 2017.

The song "Give Him the Ooh-La-La" was performed by Carol Burnett in one of her earlier TV appearances in 1956 as part of the Omnibus program The American Musical Comedy.

The show later appeared on the BBC Radio with Louise Gold and Desmond Barrit singing the lead roles.

Du Barry Was a Lady received a fully staged production in May 2014 by San Francisco's 42nd Street Moon Company starring Bruce Vilanch in the Bert Lahr role, directed and choreographed by Zack Thomas Wilde.

Casts

Songs
In an early shared credit, the songwriting duo of Hugh Martin and Ralph Blane handled the vocal arrangements for the original Broadway production.

Act I      
Where's Louie? – Ensemble 
Ev'ry Day's a Holiday – Harry Norton, Alice Barton and Ensemble 
It Ain't Etiquette – His Most Royal Majesty, The King of France and Vi Hennessey 
When Love Beckoned – Mme. La Comtesse du Barry 
Come On In – Mme. La Comtesse du Barry and Ensemble 
Dream Song – Four Internationals 
Mesdames and Messieurs – Dames de la Coeur 
Gavotte – Alice Barton and Ensemble 
But in the Morning, No! – Mme. La Comtesse du Barry and His Most Royal Majesty, The King of France 
Do I Love You? – Alex Barton and Mme. La Comtesse du Barry 
Do I Love You (Reprise) – Mme. La Comtesse du Barry and Zamore 
Du Barry Was a Lady – Entire Company 

Act II
Give Him the Ooh-La-La – Mme. La Comtesse du Barry 
Well, Did You Evah! – Alice Barton and Harry Norton 
It Was Written in the Stars – Alex Barton and Ensemble 
L'Apres Midi d'un Boeuf – Charley and Zamore 
Katie Went to Haiti – Mme. La Comtesse du Barry and Ensemble 
Katie Went to Haiti (Reprise) – Alex Barton and Mme. La Comtesse du Barry 
Friendship – Mme. La Comtesse du Barry and His Most Royal Majesty, The King of France

Reception
Brooks Atkinson wrote in The New York Times: "Although Miss Merman is jaunty and Mr. Lahr is funny, they have a hard time keeping this show merry. The authors have struck a dead level of Broadway obscenity that does not yield much mirth. As the music-maker Mr. Porter has written a number of accomplished tunes in the modern idiom and one excellent romantic song, "Do I Love You?" but the lyrics are no more inspired than the book; they treat all humor as middling. The performers supply more pleasure than the authors and composer. Betty Grable and Charles Walters, who would also be featured in a free society, dance and sing with remarkable dash."

Life praised the performers, especially Betty Grable "who can dance and sing like a May breeze" and Merman and Lahr "two musical comedy veterans...in top form."

Film

The film was released by MGM on May 30, 1943. It was directed by Roy Del Ruth. It used very little of the original Cole Porter score.

References

External links

  (1943 film adaptation)
The Shelf: Review of Du Barry Was a Lady

1939 musicals
Broadway musicals
Musicals by Cole Porter
Musicals by Herbert Fields
West End musicals
Cultural depictions of Louis XV
Cultural depictions of Madame du Barry